Edward Eric Morris was a Welsh footballer, who played as a full back in the Football League for Chester.

After leaving Sealand Road, he was a member of the Borough United side which won the Welsh Cup in 1963 and would play in two rounds of the European Cup Winners Cup (they lost on aggregate to Slovan Bratislava after eliminating Sliema Wanderers of Malta).

References

Chester City F.C. players
Ellesmere Port Town F.C. players
English Football League players
Association football fullbacks
1940 births
2011 deaths
Welsh footballers
Sportspeople from Mold, Flintshire